Radhouène Felhi (born 25 March 1984) is a Tunisian former professional footballer who played as a defender or defensive midfielder.

Club career 
Born in Meknassy, Felhi began his career with SS Meknassi, before joining Étoile Sportive du Sahel.

On 24 June 2009, he was loaned out to 2. Bundesliga club TSV 1860 Munich for one year.

On 6 October 2015, Felhi joined Lebanese Premier League side Nejmeh on a two-year contract. He helped his side win the 2015–16 Lebanese FA Cup after beating Ahed in the final on penalty shoot-outs.

Honours 
Étoile du Sahel
 CAF Champions League: 2007
 CAF Confederation Cup: 2006
 CAF Super Cup: 2008
 Tunisian Ligue Professionnelle 1: 2006–07
 Tunisian Cup: 2011–12, 2013–14
 Tunisian Coupe de la Ligue Professionnelle: 2004–05
 FIFA Club World Cup fourth place: 2007

Nejmeh
 Lebanese FA Cup: 2015–16

Tunisia
 CAF Confederation Cup: 2006

References

External links
 
 
 

1984 births
Living people
Tunisian footballers
Association football midfielders
Association football defenders
Tunisia international footballers
2008 Africa Cup of Nations players
2010 Africa Cup of Nations players
Étoile Sportive du Sahel players
TSV 1860 Munich players
Nejmeh SC players
2. Bundesliga players
Lebanese Premier League players
Tunisian expatriate footballers
Tunisian expatriate sportspeople in Germany
Expatriate footballers in Germany
Tunisian expatriate sportspeople in Lebanon
Expatriate footballers in Lebanon